Hella Tornegg was a German stage and film actress.

Selected filmography
 Lehmann's Honeymoon (1916)
 Spring Storms (1918)
 Film Kathi (1918)
 Nocturne of Love (1919)
 The Monastery of Sendomir (1919)
 Blackmailed (1920)
 The Voice (1920)
 Humanity Unleashed (1920)
 Black Forest Girl (1929)
 Bashful Felix (1934)
 Inkognito (1936)
 The Divine Jetta (1937)
 Love Can Lie (1937)
 Doctor Crippen (1942)
 Bravo Acrobat! (1943)
 Young Hearts (1944)
 Marriage of Affection (1944)
 The Noltenius Brothers (1945)

Bibliography
 Jung, Uli & Schatzberg, Walter. Beyond Caligari: The Films of Robert Wiene. Berghahn Books, 1999.

External links

1878 births
Year of death unknown
German stage actresses
German film actresses
German silent film actresses
Actresses from Berlin
20th-century German actresses